Brian Christopher Lawler (January 10, 1972 – July 29, 2018) was an American professional wrestler. He is best remembered for his career in the World Wrestling Federation (now WWE), where he performed as "Too Sexy" Brian Christopher and Grand Master Sexay. Lawler was a one-time WWF Tag Team Champion as part of Too Cool with Scotty 2 Hotty, and won 44 titles within the United States Wrestling Association, the promotion formerly co-owned by his father, professional wrestler Jerry Lawler.

Professional wrestling career

United States Wrestling Association (1988–1997) 
Lawler began his career as one half of the masked tag team "The Twilight Zone" with Tony Williams under the individual ring names of Nebula (Lawler) and Quasar (Williams). After they were unmasked, Brian continued to wrestle in the United States Wrestling Association under the name "Too Sexy" Brian Christopher. He feuded with wrestlers such as Jeff Jarrett, Bill Dundee, Tom Prichard, and The Moondogs, and his father Jerry Lawler. Among his partners were The Rock (known as Flex Kavana at the time), Tony Williams (as the New Kids), Doug Gilbert, Scotty Flamingo, and "Hot Stuff" Eddie Gilbert.

World Wrestling Federation (1997–2001) 

Lawler, still known as Brian Christopher, joined the World Wrestling Federation (WWF) in 1997 and began competing in the light heavyweight division. Taka Michinoku defeated him in the finals of a tournament for the Light Heavyweight Championship. In mid-1998, he started teaming up with Scott "Too Hot" Taylor to form the tag team Too Much. When he was known as Brian Christopher, his father Jerry Lawler would talk him up as being superior to all the other Light Heavyweights but never publicly acknowledged that Brian was his son, although after Paul Heyman revealed that fact on Raw, Jim Ross (Jerry's broadcast partner) always hinted at it. Often a running joke was that someone (usually a commentator) would mention their relationship, which led to both of them adamantly denying that they were related.

On the June 13, 1999, episode of Heat, Brian and Scott adopted the ring names Grandmaster Sexay and Scotty 2 Hotty, returning after a hiatus. Their tag team was renamed Too Cool, and they were later joined by Rikishi. They defeated Edge and Christian in May 2000 on Raw to become the Tag Team Champions. They were even occasionally involved with top-card feuds, notably being enemies to the McMahon-Helmsley Faction and their associates, such as The Radicalz, Edge and Christian, and T & A. The trio's run ended in late 2000 when Rikishi was revealed as the man behind the wheel of the car that hit Stone Cold Steve Austin at Survivor Series. Shortly after, Rikishi turned on his teammates. While Scotty was sidelined in 2001 with a broken ankle, Lawler formed a short-lived tag team with Steve Blackman. In June 2001, he was released from the WWF for illegally conveying drugs across the Canada–United States border.

World Wrestling All-Stars (2001–2002) 
In November and December 2001, Lawler (as Brian Christopher) wrestled in the United Kingdom and Ireland for World Wrestling All-Stars (WWA). On February 24, 2002, at the WWA pay per view "The Revolution" in the United States, Lawler wrestled WWA Heavyweight Champion Jeff Jarrett for the title, but lost. In April 2002, at the WWA pay-per-view "The Eruption" in Australia, Lawler teamed with Ernest Miller to defeat Buff Bagwell and Stevie Ray.

NWA Total Nonstop Action (2002–2003) 
From 2002 until 2003, he worked for NWA Total Nonstop Action as Brian Lawler. He formed a group called Next Generation with fellow second generation stars David Flair and Erik Watts. They were involved in a rivalry with Dusty Rhodes and harassed him with a replica of the NWA World Title belt that he wore when he was champion.

World Wrestling Entertainment (2004) 
Lawler returned to WWE as Grandmaster Sexay in April 12, 2004, but he was released the following month.

Late career (2004–2017) 

In July 2007, Christopher reunited with Scotty 2 Hotty at the UWF Rock 'n' Roll Express Tag Team Tournament, after Scotty was released by WWE. 

In 2009 he worked for the Hulkamania Let the Battle Begin Tour in Australia where he teamed with Rikishi.  

On the March 14, 2011 episode of Raw, Lawler returned to the WWE as a heel in a segment between Michael Cole and his father, Jerry Lawler, where Brian would side with Cole, saying that he felt that Jerry never cared for him and that he was ashamed to be his son. Lawler indirectly agreed, telling Brian that he was a bigger screw-up than Charlie Sheen. 

Lawler returned to the WWE on January 6, 2014, appearing on the "Old School" edition of Raw and reuniting with Rikishi and Scotty 2 Hotty to take on 3MB in a six-man tag team match. His team was successful in winning. He made what would be his final WWE appearance, on NXT Arrival in February 2014 as part of Too Cool in a losing effort as mystery opponents to The Ascension, who defended their NXT Tag Team Championship.

In 2014 Christopher and Scotty 2 Hotty continued teaming together in the independent circuit, England and Germany until 2016. 

On the weekend of September 22 and 23, 2017, Christopher teamed with his dad and Doug Gilbert as these lost two matches to Terry Funk and The Rock 'n' Roll Express for Big Time Wrestling in Raleigh, North Carolina and Spartanburg, South Carolina. 

Christopher's last match was on November 11, 2017 where he defeated Donnie Primetime for Georgia Premier Wrestling in Canton, Georgia.

Personal life
Lawler was a Pittsburgh Steelers fan, in stark contrast to his father, who was a diehard Cleveland Browns fan. According to his brother Kevin, Lawler was buried in a Steelers-themed casket with his ring name.

Lawler was arrested in February 2009 for disorderly conduct. On June 26, 2009, he was arrested for public intoxication just before 3 a.m. According to the police report, he "became very belligerent" once in custody and threatened the police officer who arrested him. On July 13, 2009, he was jailed for 30 days after failing to attend an in-patient treatment center as part of his plea agreement.

Death
Around 1 a.m. EST on July 7, 2018, Lawler was again jailed for driving under the influence, and for evading police. On the early morning of July 29, 2018, Lawler was found hanging in a cell at the Hardeman County Jail and was observed to be brain dead. His life support was disabled a few hours after his father Jerry Lawler had arrived to the hospital to see him. Lawler was pronounced dead at around 4:40 p.m. EST at the age of 46. 

On the one year anniversary of his death, Jerry Lawler filed a wrongful death lawsuit against Hardeman County, Hardeman County Sheriff John Doolen, and others for allegedly failing to protect Lawler. He alleged that Doolen had personally promised to "keep an eye" on Lawler after he was incarcerated. At his funeral, a little red wagon that he used to carry his numerous title belts to the ring in his USWA days was present, in memorial to the career of a decorated, respected, and well-liked wrestler.

Championships and accomplishments
Hoosier Pro Wrestling
HPW Tag Team Championship (1 time) – with Doug Gilbert
Lethal Attitude Wrestling
LAW Heavyweight Championship (1 time)
Memphis Superstars of Wrestling
MSW Junior Heavyweight Championship (1 time)
Memphis Wrestling
Memphis Wrestling Southern Heavyweight Championship (1 time)
Memphis Wrestling Television Championship (1 time)
National Wrestling Alliance
NWA North American Tag Team Championship (1 time) – with Spellbinder
NWA New South
New South Heavyweight Championship (1 time)
Powerhouse Championship Wrestling
PCW Light Heavyweight Championship (1 time)
Power Pro Wrestling
PPW Television Championship (1 time)
Pro Wrestling Illustrated
Ranked No. 367 of the 500 best singles wrestlers of the "PWI Years" in 2003
Ultimate Christian Wrestling
UCW Tag Team Championship (1 time) – with Billy Jack
United States Wrestling Association
USWA Heavyweight Championship (26 times)
USWA Junior Heavyweight Championship (1 time)
USWA Southern Heavyweight Championship (8 times)
USWA Texas Heavyweight Championship (1 time)
USWA World Tag Team Championship (6 times) – with Big Black Dog (1), Scotty Anthony (1), Jeff Jarrett (2), Eddie Gilbert (1) and Wolfie D (1)
GWF Light Heavyweight Championship (2 times)
World Wrestling Federation
WWF Tag Team Championship (1 time) – with Scotty 2 Hotty

See also
 List of premature professional wrestling deaths

References

External links

 
 

1972 births
2018 deaths
2018 suicides
20th-century professional wrestlers
21st-century professional wrestlers
American male professional wrestlers
American people who died in prison custody
People who committed suicide in prison custody
Prisoners who died in Tennessee detention
Professional wrestlers from Tennessee
Sportspeople from Memphis, Tennessee
Suicides by hanging in Tennessee
USWA World Tag Team Champions